The Enemy Within campaign (abbreviated to TEW) is a series of adventures for Warhammer Fantasy Roleplay originally published by Games Workshop in the late 1980s. The campaign was voted the best RPG campaign of all time by Casus Belli magazine.

History
The Enemy Within (1986-1989) is a series of linked adventure scenarios published by Games Workshop for Warhammer Fantasy Roleplay that was praised as a detailed campaign that actually told a story. The first adventure in the series is The Enemy Within (1986) by Jim Bambra, Phil Gallagher, and Graeme Davis, followed by: Shadows Over Bögenhafen (1987) by Davis, Bambra, and Gallagher; Death on the Reik (1987) by Gallagher, Bambra, and Davis; Power Behind the Throne (1988) by Carl Sargent, Something Rotten in Kislev (1989) by Ken Rolston with Graeme Davis, and Empire in Flames (1989) by Sargent.

Shadows Over Bögenhafen (1995) from Hogshead Publishing is the first in a series of published adventures reissuing Games Workshop's The Enemy Within campaign; according to Shannon Appelcline, the updated Enemy Within campaign (1995-1999) was well received.

Composition
This multi-part role playing adventure comprises several linked adventures:

The Enemy Within / Mistaken Identity Graeme Davis, Jim Bambra, Phil Gallagher
Shadows Over Bögenhafen
Death on the Reik
Power Behind the Throne
Something Rotten in Kislev Ken Rolston, Graeme Davis (editor)
Empire in Flames

Throughout their publication by Games Workshop and, later, Hogshead Publishing, the individual adventures were variously bound and combined. Most often, The Enemy Within was bound together with Shadows Over Bogenhafen in a single volume. Power Behind the Throne was sometimes combined with City of Chaos (originally titled City of the White Wolf), a supplement covering the city of Middenheim in detail.

Reception
In Issue 9 of The Games Machine, John Woods reviews the fourth adventure in the series and notes a change in style from the previous adventures: "Whereas previous scenarios in this series have been fairly typical action-packed mysteries with rather linear plotlines (too linear on occasion - things can get awkward for the referee if players think of courses of action the designers didn’t anticipate), this adventure is a more open-ended political thriller." He concluded, "An unusual scenario with a greater need for referee and player skill than its predecessors - should be a lot of fun."

Reviews
White Wolf #9 (1988)

References

Warhammer Fantasy Roleplay adventures